The Clones of Dr. Funkenstein is the fifth album by funk band Parliament, released in September 1976. The album is notable for featuring horn arrangements by ex-James Brown band member, Fred Wesley. The album charted at #3 on the Billboard R&B Albums chart, #20 on the Billboard pop chart, and became Parliament's second album to be certified gold. Two singles were released off the album, "Do That Stuff", which charted at #22, and "Dr. Funkenstein" which charted at #43.

Track listing

Personnel 
Lead vocals - George Clinton (lead in "Prelude", "Dr. Funkenstein"), Calvin Simon, Fuzzy Haskins, Raymond Davis, Grady Thomas, Garry Shider (lead in "Getten' to Know You"), Glenn Goins (lead in "I've Been Watching You", "Funkin' for Fun"), Bootsy Collins
Horns - Fred Wesley, Maceo Parker, Rick Gardner, Michael Brecker, Randy Brecker
Bass guitar - Cordell Mosson, Bootsy Collins, Renny Jones
Guitars - Garry Shider, Michael Hampton, Glen Goins
Drums and percussion - Jerome Brailey, Bootsy Collins, Gary Cooper
 Keyboards and synthesizers - Bernie Worrell
Backing vocals and handclaps - Debbie Edwards, Taka Khan, Gary Cooper

Horn arrangement by Bernie Worrell (tracks 2, 7, 8, 9) and Fred Wesley (tracks 3, 4, 5, 6).
Production
Produced by George Clinton
Engineered by Igor Jim Callow, Igor Jim Vitti  
Mastered br Allen Zentz
Photography by Ron Slenzak
Art Direction and Design by Chris Whorf/Gribbitt!

References

External links 
 The Clones of Dr. Funkenstein at Discogs

1976 albums
Parliament (band) albums
Casablanca Records albums
Science fiction concept albums